The 13th Floor is the fourth studio album by the Norwegian gothic metal band Sirenia and their first with the Spanish vocalist Ailyn. It was released on 23 January 2009, through Nuclear Blast. The album features guest appearances by Jan Kenneth Barkved (who had also made some guest appearances on their album At Sixes and Sevens), and the French violin player, Stephanie Valentin, who adds to the sound along with the choir that has been a part of their sound since the beginning. The album was released in three formats: CD, CD-Digi and box set. The box set edition was restricted to 500 copies worldwide. The download-only single, "The Path to Decay", was released on 26 December 2008.

Track listing
All songs written by Morten Veland.

 The multimedia part includes photo gallery, wallpapers and screensavers. "The Path to Decay" was released as a promotional single and also has a video.

Personnel

Sirenia
Ailyn – female vocals (on all tracks)
Morten Veland – clean male vocals (on track #4), harsh vocals (on all tracks except #2 & #7), all other instruments

Additional musicians
Jan Kenneth Barkved – clean male vocals (on track #9)
Stephanie Valentin – violin (on tracks #3, #7, #8 & #9)
Damien Surian, Mathieu Landry, Emmanuelle Zoldan, Sandrine Gouttebe, Emilie Lesbros – choir (on all tracks)

Production
Arranged, produced and engineered by Morten Veland
Additional recording at Sound Suite Studios by Terje Refsnes
Mixed by Morten Veland and Tue Madsen
Mastered by Tue Madsen
Artwork by Jan Yrlund

Charts

References

External links
The 13th Floor on The Metal Archives
The 13th Floor at discogs.com

2009 albums
Nuclear Blast albums
Sirenia (band) albums